Novxanı (also, Novkhany, Novkhana, Novxana, and Nobkhana) is a village and municipality in the Absheron District of Azerbaijan. It has a population of 4,468. The name means new house in Persian language.

Notable natives 
 Azim Azimzade — painter and graphic artist, founder of Azerbaijani satirical graphics, People's Artist of Azerbaijan SSR (1927).
 Lotfi A. Zadeh — American mathematician, electrical engineer, computer scientist, founder of the theory of fuzzy sets and fuzzy logic.
 Mahammad Amin Rasulzade — statesman, scholar, public figure and one of the founders of Azerbaijan Democratic Republic, the chairman of the Azerbaijani National Council (1918).
 Mehdi Huseynzade — legendary guerrilla fighter in Yugoslavia and Italy during World War II, Hero of the Soviet Union.
 Suleyman Rustam — poet, the People's Poet of Azerbaijan SSR (1960).
 Suriyya Aliyev — highly respected elder, local mosque keeper and widowed grandfather of 7 (2016).

Gallery

References

External links

AF Hotel Novkhani (The largest hotel and resort in Caucasus) 
Map of Novkhani

Populated places in Absheron District
Villages in Azerbaijan